The Dillard B. and Georgia Sewell House is a historic summer house at 64 Clipper Lane in western Henderson County, North Carolina.  It is a -story rustic stone structure, with a wood shake roof and a full-width porch fronting a stone patio.  It is located southeast of Penrose, atop Jeter Mountain on a  parcel straddling the county line between Henderson and Transylvania Counties.  The house was built in 1924 for Dillard Sewell, an insurance company executive from Charleston, South Carolina, and his wife Georgia.  It is a well-preserved example of Rustic Revival architecture.

The property was listed on the National Register of Historic Places in 2015.

See also
National Register of Historic Places listings in Henderson County, North Carolina
National Register of Historic Places listings in Transylvania County, North Carolina

References

Houses on the National Register of Historic Places in North Carolina
Rustic architecture in North Carolina
Houses completed in 1924
Houses in Henderson County, North Carolina
National Register of Historic Places in Henderson County, North Carolina
Houses in Transylvania County, North Carolina
National Register of Historic Places in Transylvania County, North Carolina
1924 establishments in North Carolina